Madhu C Narayanan is an Indian film director, who works predominantly in Malayalam movie industry. His directorial debut, Kumbalangi Nights, received immense critical acclaim for its realistic and poignant portrayal of a dysfunctional family.

Early life
In the beginning, Madhu collaborated with several  Advertisement companies as an Associate. Madhu made his entry in feature films through Aashiq Abu's Daddy Cool where he served as an assistant director. From Aashiq's third film 22 Female Kottayam onwards, Madhu frequently collaborated with him as an associate director. Madhu C Narayanan's stint as associate director also includes Dileesh Pothan's Maheshinte Prathikaaram and Shyju Khalid's "Sethulakshmi" (Anthology segment; 5 Sundarikal). He also served as a creative contributor  in Thondimuthalum Driksakshiyum

Career
Madhu C Narayanan's debut movie Kumbalangi Nights, came out in 2019. The movie received critical acclaim and was a commercial success as well. Later Kumbalangi Nights achieved a widespread recognition as the praising reviews for the movie appeared in global media like The Guardian.

Filmography

As director

As Assistant Director

As associate director

Awards

References 

 Gollapudi Srinivas National Award 2019 goes to Madhu C Narayanan for ‘Kumbalangi Nights’, Aditya Dhar for ‘Uri’ Gollapudi Srinivas National Award 2019 goes to Madhu C Narayanan for ‘Kumbalangi Nights’, Aditya Dhar for ‘Uri’
 Director Madhu C. Narayanan thanks the audience for making 'Kumbalangi Nights' a success Director Madhu C. Narayanan thanks the audience for making 'Kumbalangi Nights' a success - Times of India
 It's important to pay attention to details in films, says Madhu C Narayanan It’s important to pay attention to details in films, says Madhu C Narayanan
 My streaming gem: why you should watch Kumbalangi Nights My streaming gem: why you should watch Kumbalangi Nights
 'Kumbalangi Nights' director, Madhu C Narayanan bags Aravindan Puraskaram 'Kumbalangi Nights' director, Madhu C Narayanan bags Aravindan Puraskaram - Times of India
 Fahadh doesn't play the hero but he agreed at once: 'Kumbalangi Nights' director Madhu Fahadh doesn't play the hero but he agreed at once: 'Kumbalangi Nights' director Madhu
 We gave the script and actors the necessary space: Madhu C Narayanan We gave the script and actors the necessary space: Madhu C Narayanan
 Director Madhu C. Narayanan thanks the audience for making 'Kumbalangi Nights' a success Director Madhu C. Narayanan thanks the audience for making 'Kumbalangi Nights' a success - Times of India
 Two years of 'Kumbalangi Nights': 5 memorable scenes from the Malayalam superhit Two years of 'Kumbalangi Nights': 5 memorable scenes from the Malayalam superhit
 Anna Ben Wins Kerala State Film Award: What's Her Journey Been Like?Anna Ben Films: What's Her Journey Been Like?
പത്മരാജന്‍ പുരസ്‌ക്കാരം പ്രഖ്യാപിച്ചു 
 കുമ്പളങ്ങി നൈറ്റ്സിനെ പ്രശംസിച്ച് അനുഷ്ക ശർമ്മ!

External links 
  
സുരാജ് മികച്ച നടൻ പാർവതി നടി, മോഹൻലാൽ വെർസറ്റൈൽ ആക്ടർ
Madhu C. Narayanan: Movies, Photos, Videos, News, Biography & Birthday | eTimes
Malayalam actress Anna Ben tests positive for COVID-19; Says 'have all symptoms'
WCC members, many in Malayalam film industry support Dileep case sexual assault survivor
15 brilliant movies you need to stream right now, according to Humans of Cinema

1977 births
Living people
Kerala State Film Award winners
Malayalam film directors
Film directors from Kerala
21st-century Indian film directors